The 2015–16 season Wydad AC will participate in this season's editions of the Botola Pro, Coupe du Trône and CAF Champions League.

Current squad

References

2015–16 in Moroccan football